Orestes was  the son of Agamemnon and Clytemnestra, in Greek mythology.

Orestes or Orestis may also refer to:
 Orestes (Greek myth), other figures in Greek mythology

In drama:
 Orestes (play), a tragedy by Euripides
 A character in the tragedy Electra (Sophocles)
 A character in Aeschylus' trilogy of tragedies Oresteia

Places:
 Orestes, Indiana, United States, a town
 Orestis (region), in Upper Macedonia
 Mount Orestes, Victoria Land, Antarctica
 Orestes Valley, Victoria Land, Antarctica
 Orestes Glacier, Victoria Land, Antarctica
 13475 Orestes, an asteroid sharing the planet Jupiter's orbit

Watercraft:
 HMS Orestes, various British Royal Navy ships
 USS Orestes (AGP-10), a United States Navy motor torpedo boat tender

Other uses:
 Orestes (insect), a genus of stick insects
 Orestes (given name), and persons with the name Orestes, Orestis, Oreste or Orest
 Orestes (footballer) (born 1981), Brazilian footballer
 The song "Orestes" by A Perfect Circle on Mer de Noms

See also
 Lucius Aurelius Orestes (consul 157 BC), a consul of the Roman republic
 Lucius Aurelius Orestes (consul 126 BC), a consul of the Roman republic and governor of Sardinia
 Orestes (prefect), prefect of Alexandria during the 4th century AD
 Orestes (father of Romulus Augustulus), 5th Century Roman general and father of Western Roman Emperor, Romulus Augustulus
 Oreste, an opera by George Frideric Handel
 Horestes, a morality play by John Pickering